Lal Bahadur Shastri Memorial college, established in 1971, is a general degree college in the Jharkhand state of India. It offers undergraduate and postgraduate courses in arts, commerce and sciences. It is affiliated to  Kolhan University.

Departments

Science
Chemistry 
Physics 
Mathematics 
Botany 
Zoology

Arts and Commerce

Odia
Hindi
English
History
Maithili
Ho
Santali
Urdu
Political Science
Economics
Philosophy
Geography
Psychology
Education
Commerce
Bengali

See also
Education in India
Literacy in India
List of institutions of higher education in Jharkhand

References

External links
 

Colleges affiliated to Kolhan University
Educational institutions established in 1971
Universities and colleges in Jharkhand
Education in Jamshedpur